Mesodon thyroidus is a species of air-breathing land snail, a terrestrial gastropod mollusk in the family Polygyridae.

Parasites 
Parasites of Mesodon thyroidus include:
  The nematode Parelaphostrongylus tenuis

References

External links
  Mesodon thyroidus on the UF / IFAS Featured Creatures Web site

Polygyridae
Gastropods described in 1816
Taxa named by Thomas Say